Nik Shahr County is in Sistan and Baluchestan province, Iran. The capital of the county is the city of Nik Shahr. At the 2006 census, the county's population was 185,355 in 37,858 fhouseholds. The following census in 2011 counted 212,963 people in 50,419 households. At the 2016 census, the county's population was 141,894 in 37,207 households, by which time Fanuj District had been separated from the county to form Fanuj County, and Qasr-e Qand District to become Qasr-e Qand County. After the census, two rural districts and a city of Lashar District had been separated from the county to form Lashar County.

Administrative divisions

The population history and structural changes of Nik Shahr County's administrative divisions over three consecutive censuses are shown in the following table. The latest census shows five districts, 11 rural districts, and three cities.

References

 

Counties of Sistan and Baluchestan Province